Silver Lake State Park is the name of several parks in the United States:

Silver Lake State Park (New York)
Silver Lake State Park (New Hampshire)
Silver Lake State Park (Michigan)
Silver Lake State Park (Vermont)